The Bolivian National Congress 1942–1944 was elected in March 1942.

Chamber of Senators

Chamber of Deputies 

PL – Liberal Party

MNR – Revolutionary Nationalist Movement

PIR – Revolutionary Left Party

PSOB – Socialist Workers' Party of Bolivia

PSU – United Socialist Party

POT – Workers' Party of Tarija

PRS – Socialist Republican Party

PRG – Genuine Republican Party

FSB – Bolivian Socialist Falange.

ind – independents

Notes

Political history of Bolivia